Svatba jako řemen is a Czech comedy film directed by Jiří Krejčík and released in 1967.

The film tells the story of a man getting ready for his wedding, who, wanting to enjoy his freedom one last time, goes a little far and gets involved in an alleged rape. Two bumbling police officers are placed in charge of the investigation. Consequently, the groom gets arrested and doesn't manage to arrive to his wedding on time, causing his bride and her family anguish.

External links
 

1967 films
Czechoslovak comedy films
1967 comedy films
Czech comedy films
1960s Czech films